Qubes OS is a security-focused desktop Linux distribution that aims to provide security through isolation. Virtualization is performed by Xen, and user environments can be based on (with official support) Fedora or Debian, or (with community support "these templates may be somewhat less stable, since the Qubes developers do not test them") Whonix, Ubuntu, Arch Linux, CentOS, or Gentoo among other operating systems; e.g. Qubes Windows Tools support Microsoft Windows 7 and later.

Systems like Qubes are referred to in academia as Converged Multi-Level Secure (MLS) Systems. Other proposals of similar systems have surfaced and SecureView is a commercial competitor, however Qubes OS is the only system of the kind actively being developed under a free and open-source software (FOSS) license.

Security goals 

Qubes implements a Security by Isolation approach. 
The assumption is that there can be no perfect, bug-free desktop environment: such an environment counts millions of lines of code and billions of software/hardware interactions. One critical bug in any of these interactions may be enough for malicious software to take control of a machine.

To secure a desktop a Qubes user takes care to isolate various environments, so that if one of the components gets compromised, the malicious software would get access to only the data inside that environment.

In Qubes, the isolation is provided in two dimensions: hardware controllers can be isolated into functional domains (e.g. network domains, USB controller domains), whereas the user's digital life is divided into domains with different levels of trust. 
For instance: work domain (most trusted), shopping domain, random domain (less trusted). Each of those domains is run in a separate virtual machine (VM).

Qubes VMs, by default, have passwordless root access (e.g. passwordless sudo). UEFI Secure Boot is not supported out of the box, but this is not considered a major security issue. 
Qubes is not a multiuser system.

Installation and requirements 

Qubes was not intended to be run as part of a multi-boot system because if an attacker were to take control of one of the other operating systems then they would likely be able to compromise Qubes (e.g. before Qubes boots). 
However, it is still possible to use Qubes as part of a multi-boot system and even to use grub2 as the boot loader/boot manager. 
A standard Qubes installation takes all space on the storage medium (e.g. hard drive, USB flash drive) to which it is installed (not just all available free space) and it uses LUKS/dm-crypt full disk encryption. 
It is possible to customize much of the Qubes OS installation but for security reasons, this is discouraged for users that are not intimately familiar with Qubes. 
Qubes 4.x needs at least 32 GiB of disk space and 4 GB of RAM.
However, in practice, it typically needs upwards of 6-8 GB of RAM, since although it is possible to run it with only 4 GB of RAM, users will likely be limited to running no more than about three Qubes at a time.

Since 2013, Qubes has not had support for 32-bit x86 architectures and now requires a 64-bit processor. 
Qubes uses Intel VT-d/AMD's AMD-Vi, which is only available on 64-bit architectures, to isolate devices and drivers. 
The 64-bit architecture also provides a little more protection against some classes of attacks. 
Since Qubes 4.x, Qubes requires either an Intel processor with support for VT-x with EPT and Intel VT-d virtualization technology or an AMD processor with support for AMD-V with RVI (SLAT) and AMD-Vi (aka AMD IOMMU) virtualization technology. 
Qubes targets the desktop market. 
This market is dominated by laptops running Intel processors and chipsets and consequently, Qubes developers focus on Intel's VT-x/VT-d technologies. 
This is not a major issue for AMD processors since AMD IOMMU is functionally identical to Intel's VT-d.

User experience
The users interact with Qubes OS very much the same way they would interact with a regular desktop operating system. But there are some key differences:
 Each security domain (Qube) is identified by a different colored window border
 Opening an application for the first time in that session for a particular security domain will take around 30 seconds, depending on hardware
 Copying files and clipboard is a little different since domains do not share a clipboard or file system
 The user can create and manage security compartments

System architecture overview

Xen hypervisor and administrative domain (Dom0)
The hypervisor provides isolation between different VMs. The administrative domain, also referred to as Dom0 (a term inherited from Xen), has direct access to all the hardware by default. Dom0 hosts the GUI domain and controls the graphics device, as well as input devices, such as the keyboard and mouse. The GUI domain runs the X server, which displays the user's desktop, and the window manager, which allows the user to start and stop the applications and manipulate their windows.

Integration of the different VMs is provided by the Application Viewer, which provides an illusion for the user that applications execute natively on the desktop, while in fact they are hosted (and isolated) in different VMs. Qubes integrates all these VMs onto one common desktop environment.

Because Dom0 is security-sensitive, it is isolated from the network. It tends to have as little interface and communication with other domains as possible in order to minimize the possibility of an attack originating from an infected VM.

The Dom0 domain manages the virtual disks of the other VMs, which are actually stored as files on the dom0 file system(s). Disk space is saved by virtue of various VMs sharing the same root file system in a read-only mode. Separate disk storage is only used for userʼs directory and per-VM settings. This allows software installation and updates to be centralized. It is also possible to install software only on a specific VM, by installing it as the non-root user, or by installing it in the non-standard, Qubes-specific /rw hierarchy.

Network domain
The network mechanism is the most exposed to security attacks. To circumvent this it is isolated in a separate, unprivileged VM, named the Network Domain.

Another firewall VM is used to house the Linux-kernel-based firewall, so that even if the network domain is compromised due to a device driver bug, the firewall is still isolated and protected (as it is running in a separate Linux kernel in a separate VM).

Application Virtual Machines (AppVM)
AppVMs are the VMs used for hosting user applications, such as a web browser, an email client or a text editor. For security purposes, these applications can be grouped in different domains, such as personal, work, shopping, bank, etc. The security domains are implemented as separate VMs, thus being isolated from each other as if they were executing on different machines.

Some documents or applications can be run in disposable VMs through an action available in the file manager. The mechanism follows the idea of sandboxes: after viewing the document or application, then the whole Disposable VM will be destroyed.

Each security domain is labelled by a color, and each window is marked by the color of the domain it belongs to. So it is always clearly visible to which domain a given window belongs.

Reception 
Security and privacy experts such as Edward Snowden, Daniel J. Bernstein, and Christopher Soghoian have publicly praised the project.

Jesse Smith wrote review of Qubes OS 3.1 for DistroWatch Weekly:

Kyle Rankin from Linux Journal reviewed Qubes OS in 2016:

In 2014, Qubes was selected as a finalist of Access Innovation Prize 2014 for Endpoint Security, run by the international human rights organization Access Now.

See also 
 Hyperjacking
 Tails (operating system)
 Whonix

Notes

References

External links

 
 Qubes OS on DistroWatch

2012 software
Linux distributions
Operating system security
RPM-based Linux distributions
Tor onion services
X86-64 Linux distributions